Regulating synaptic membrane exocytosis protein 1 is a protein that in humans is encoded by the RIMS1 gene.

Function 

RAB3A (MIM 179490), a member of the Ras superfamily of genes, is a synaptic vesicle protein that regulates synaptic vesicle exocytosis. MUNC13 (UNC13; MIM 605836) and its isoforms are required for priming synaptic vesicles for exocytosis. The RIM family of active zone proteins likely function as protein scaffolds that help regulate vesicle exocytosis during short-term plasticity.[supplied by OMIM]

Clinical significance 
Mutations of the gene cause cone-rod dystrophy 7.

Interactions 

RIMS1 has been shown to interact with:
 ERC2, 
 RAB3A, 
UNC13A,
 UNC13B,  and
 YWHAH.

References

Further reading